Arthur Ronald Hurst (13 July 1931 – 20 August 2014) was an Australian rules footballer who played for the St Kilda Football Club in the Victorian Football League (VFL).

Notes

External links 

1931 births
Australian rules footballers from Victoria (Australia)
St Kilda Football Club players
2014 deaths